Dorothy Leigh Sayers (13 June 1893 – 17 December 1957) was an English crime writer and poet. She was also a student of classical and modern languages.

She is best known for her mysteries, a series of novels and short stories set between the First and Second World Wars that feature English aristocrat and amateur sleuth Lord Peter Wimsey. As a crime writer during the "Golden Age of Detective Fiction", Sayers was considered one of its four "Queens of Crime", alongside Agatha Christie, Margery Allingham and Ngaio Marsh.

Sayers is also known for her plays, literary criticism, and essays. She considered her translation of Dante's Divine Comedy to be her best work. Sayers's obituarist, writing in The New York Times in 1957, noted that many critics at the time regarded her mystery The Nine Tailors as her finest literary achievement.

Biography

Childhood, youth, and education 

Sayers, an only child, was born on 13 June 1893 at the Headmaster's House on Brewer Street in Oxford. She was the daughter of Helen Mary Leigh and her husband, the Rev. Henry Sayers. Her mother was a daughter of Frederick Leigh, a solicitor whose family roots were in the landed gentry in the Isle of Wight, and had been born at "The Chestnuts", Millbrook, Hampshire. Her father, originally from Littlehampton, West Sussex, was a chaplain of Christ Church Cathedral, Oxford, and headmaster of Christ Church Cathedral School.

When Sayers was six, her father started teaching her Latin. She grew up in the tiny village of Bluntisham in Huntingdonshire after her father was given the living there as rector of Bluntisham-cum-Earith. The church graveyard next to the elegant Regency-style rectory features the surnames of several characters from her mystery The Nine Tailors. She was inspired by her father's restoration of the Bluntisham church bells in 1910. The nearby River Great Ouse and the Fens invite comparison with the book's vivid description of a massive flood around the village.

From 1909 Sayers was educated at the Godolphin School, a boarding school in Salisbury. Her father later moved to the living of Christchurch, in Cambridgeshire.

In 1912, Sayers received the Gilchrist Scholarship for Modern Languages to Somerville College, Oxford where she studied modern languages and medieval literature and was taught by Mildred Pope. She graduated with first-class honours in 1915. Women were not awarded degrees at that time, but Sayers was among the first to receive a degree when the position changed a few years later; in 1920 she graduated as an MA. Her experience of Oxford academic life eventually inspired her penultimate Peter Wimsey novel, Gaudy Night.

Career

Poetry, teaching, and advertisements 
Sayers's first book of poetry was published in 1916 as OP. I by Blackwell Publishing in Oxford. Her second book of poems, "Catholic Tales and Christian Songs", was published in 1918, also by Blackwell. Later, Sayers worked for Blackwell's and then as a teacher in several locations, including Normandy, France. She also published a number of poems in the Oxford Magazine. In 1920 Sayers contributed two poems, one of them a love poem named Veronica to the first and only issue of The Quorum, the UK's first homosexual magazine.

In the early 1920s she worked for the publisher Victor Gollancz. One of the writers she dealt with was A. M. Burrage, who knew her husband and with whom she corresponded on friendly terms.

Sayers's longest employment was from 1922 to 1931 as a copywriter at S.H. Benson's advertising agency, located at International Buildings, Kingsway, London. A colleague of hers at the agency was Albert Henry Ross (1881–1950) who is better known by his literary pseudonym Frank Morison. He wrote the best-selling Christian apologetics book Who Moved the Stone? which explored the historicity of the trial, crucifixion and resurrection of Jesus. Sayers later relied on his book when she composed the trial scene of Jesus in her play The Man Born to Be King.

As an advertiser, Sayers's collaboration with artist John Gilroy resulted in "The Mustard Club" for Colman's Mustard and the Guinness "Zoo" advertisements, variations of which still appear today. One example was the Toucan, his bill arching under a glass of Guinness, with Sayers's jingle:

Sayers is also credited with coining the slogan "It pays to advertise!" She used the advertising industry as the setting of Murder Must Advertise, where she describes the role of truth in advertising:

Detective fiction 

Sayers began working out the plot of her first novel some time in 1920–21. The seeds of the plot for Whose Body? can be seen in a letter that Sayers wrote on 22 January 1921: 
The victim was changed to a man in the final version.

Lord Peter Wimsey featured in eleven novels and two sets of short stories. Sayers once commented that Lord Peter was a mixture of Fred Astaire and Bertie Wooster. Sayers introduced the character of detective novelist Harriet Vane in Strong Poison. She remarked more than once that she had developed the "husky voiced, dark-eyed" Harriet to put an end to Lord Peter via matrimony. But in the course of writing Gaudy Night, Sayers imbued Lord Peter and Harriet with so much life that she was never able, as she put it, to "see Lord Peter exit the stage".

She co-wrote with Robert Eustace one murder mystery that did not feature Wimsey, The Documents in the Case, and wrote a portion of three other mysteries with several members of the Detection Club.

Sayers's detective stories explored the trauma of World War I veterans in The Unpleasantness at the Bellona Club, discussed the ethics of advertising in Murder Must Advertise, and advocated women's education (then a controversial subject) and role in society in Gaudy Night. In Gaudy Night, Miss Barton writes a book attacking the Nazi doctrine of Kinder, Küche, Kirche, which restricted women's roles to family activities, and in many ways the novel can be read as an attack on Nazi social doctrine. It has been described as "the first feminist mystery novel." Sayers's Christian and academic experiences are themes in her detective series.

Sayers also wrote eleven short stories about Montague Egg, a wine and spirits salesman who solves mysteries. Six of these appear in her collection Hangman's Holiday (1933), the remaining five in In the Teeth of the Evidence (1939).

Translations 
Sayers herself considered her translation of Dante's Divine Comedy to be her best work. Hell appeared in 1949, as one of the then-recently introduced series of Penguin Classics. Purgatory followed in 1955. The third volume (Paradise) was unfinished at her death, and was completed by Barbara Reynolds in 1962.

Sayers's translation preserves the original Italian terza rima rhyme scheme. The line usually rendered "Abandon all hope, ye who enter here" turns, in the Sayers translation, into "Lay down all hope, you who go in by me,"  so that her "go in by me" rhymes with "made to be" two lines earlier, and "unsearchably" two lines before that. The Italian reads "Lasciate ogne speranza, voi ch'intrate", and both the traditional rendering and Sayers's translation add to the source text in an effort to preserve the original length: "here" is added in the traditional, and "by me" in Sayers. Also, the addition of "by me" draws from the previous lines of the canto: "Per me si va ne la città dolente;/ per me si va ne l'etterno dolore;/ per me si va tra la perduta gente." (Longfellow: "Through me the way is to the city dolent;/ through me the way is to the eternal dole;/ through me the way is to the people lost.") Umberto Eco, in his book Mouse or Rat? suggests that, of the various English translations, Sayers "does the best in at least partially preserving the hendecasyllables and the rhyme."

Sayers's translation of the Divine Comedy includes extensive notes at the end of each canto, explaining the theological meaning of what she calls "a great Christian allegory." Her translation has remained popular: in spite of publishing new translations by Mark Musa and Robin Kirkpatrick, as of 2009 Penguin Books was still publishing the Sayers edition.

In the introduction to her translation of The Song of Roland, Sayers expressed an outspoken feeling of attraction and love for: "... That new-washed world of clear sun and glittering colour which we call the Middle Age (as though it were middle-aged) but which has perhaps a better right than the blown rose of the Renaissance to be called the Age of Re-birth". She praised Roland for being a purely Christian myth, in contrast to such epics as Beowulf in which she found a strong pagan content.

She shared an enthusiasm for Dante's work with the novelist, poet, playwright and lay-theologian Charles Williams (1886-1945) and she contributed an essay about The Divine Comedy to the memorial volume Essays Presented to Charles Williams.

Other Christian and academic work 
Sayers's religious book The Mind of the Maker (1941) explores at length the analogy between a human creator (especially a writer of novels and plays) and the doctrine of the Trinity in creation. She suggests that any human creation of significance involves the Idea, the Energy (roughly: the process of writing and that actual 'incarnation' as a material object), and the Power (roughly: the process of reading and hearing and the effect that it has on the audience). She draws analogies between this "trinity" and the theological Trinity of Father, Son, and Holy Spirit. The book contains examples drawn from her own experiences as a writer, as well as criticisms of writers who exhibit, in her view, an inadequate balance of Idea, Energy, and Power. She strongly defends the view that literary creatures have a nature of their own, vehemently replying to a well-wisher who wanted Wimsey to "end up a convinced Christian". "From what I know of him, nothing is more unlikely ... Peter is not the Ideal Man".

Creed or Chaos? is a restatement of basic historical Christian doctrine, based on the Apostles' Creed, the Nicene Creed, and the Athanasian Creed, similar to but somewhat more densely written than C. S. Lewis' Mere Christianity. Both sought to explain the central doctrines of Christianity, clearly and concisely, to those who had encountered them in distorted or watered-down forms, on the grounds that, if you are going to criticise something, you had best know what it is first.

Her influential essay "The Lost Tools of Learning" has been used by many schools in the US as a basis for the classical education movement, reviving the medieval trivium subjects (grammar, logic, and rhetoric) as tools to enable the analysis and mastery of every other subject. Sayers also wrote three volumes of commentaries about Dante, religious essays, and several plays, of which The Man Born to Be King may be the best known. The Just Vengeance, written for the 1946 Lichfield Festival and the 750th anniversary of Lichfield Cathedral, was produced in the cathedral with Elizabeth, the Queen Mother in the audience.

The religious works of Sayers did so well at presenting the orthodox Anglican position that, in 1943, the Archbishop of Canterbury, William Temple, offered her a Lambeth doctorate in divinity, which she declined, explaining that “I have only served Divinity, as it were, accidentally, coming to it as a writer rather than as a Christian person.” They had an extensive correspondence, in which Temple tried to persuade her to accept a DD, and Sayers said she would see no problem about accepting a doctorate of letters. Temple concluded that he would mention this to others. In 1950, Sayers accepted an honorary degree of D. Litt. from the University of Durham.

Views

Women's rights 
Sayers refused to be identified as a feminist stating, "I am afraid—that I was not sure I wanted to 'identify myself,' as the phrase goes, with feminism, and that the time for 'feminism,' in the old-fashioned sense of the word, had gone past." However, that did not prevent her from grappling with inequalities brought about from gender discrimination and responding to issues on women's rights. In her essay, Are Women Human?, an address she gave to a Women's Society in 1938, she writes in clarifying what feminism should be, considering how assertions such as, "a woman is as good as a man" or the tendency to "copy what men do", may in fact subvert the point an advocate of women's rights would want to prove in the first place. In the essay she concludes with this:
Indeed, it is my experience that both men and women are fundamentally human, and that there is very little mystery about either sex, except the exasperating mysteriousness of human beings in general...If you wish to preserve a free democracy, you must base it—not on classes and categories, for this will land you in the totalitarian State, where no one may act or think except as the member of a category. You must base it upon the individual Tom, Dick and Harry, on the individual Jack and Jill—in fact, upon you and me.Rather than discriminating between the differences of genders she believed that it is the recognition of our shared humanity as individual human beings upon which equality should be built.

Sayers continues to elaborate on the same argument in her other essay The Human-Not-Quite-Human in which she satirises existing gender stereotypes by flipping them around.

Feminism
Gaudy Night has been described as "the first feminist mystery novel." It is a novel that extensively discusses feminist positions. Sayers distanced herself from feminist political labels, and preferred to be considered "simply human". Crystal Downing notes that Sayers "refused to call herself a feminist, believing in practicing women's rights more than in preaching them."

Nevertheless, a number of scholars have identified her as a feminist. Susan Haack calls her an "old-fashioned, humanistic, individualistic feminist." Mo Moulton argues that Sayers "was not born a feminist; she became one, through bitter suffering and the stark realization of the precariousness of her position in a world which denied female sexuality in all sorts of ways."

Criticism

Novels
The poet W. H. Auden and the philosopher Ludwig Wittgenstein were notable critics of her novels. A savage attack on Sayers's writing ability came from the American critic Edmund Wilson, in a well-known 1945 article in The New Yorker called "Who Cares Who Killed Roger Ackroyd?" He briefly writes about her novel The Nine Tailors, saying "I declare that it seems to me one of the dullest books I have ever encountered in any field." Wilson continues "I had often heard people say that Dorothy Sayers wrote well ... but, really, she does not write very well: it is simply that she is more consciously literary than most of the other detective-story writers and that she thus attracts attention in a field which is mostly on a sub-literary level."

The academic critic Q. D. Leavis criticises Sayers in more specific terms in a review of Gaudy Night and Busman's Honeymoon, published in the critical journal Scrutiny, saying her fiction is "popular and romantic while pretending to realism." Leavis argues that Sayers presents academic life as "sound and sincere because it is scholarly," a place of "invulnerable standards of taste charging the charmed atmosphere". But, Leavis says, this is unrealistic: "If such a world ever existed, and I should be surprised to hear as much, it does no longer, and to give substance to a lie or to perpetuate a dead myth is to do no one any service really." Leavis comments that "only best-seller novelists could have such illusions about human nature."

The critic Sean Latham has defended Sayers, arguing that Wilson and Leavis simply objected to a detective story writer having pretensions beyond what they saw as her role of popular culture "hack". Latham says that, in their eyes, "Sayers' primary crime lay in her attempt to transform the detective novel into something other than an ephemeral bit of popular culture".

Characters 
Lord Peter Wimsey, Sayers's heroic detective, has been criticised as too perfect; over time, the various talents that he displays grow too numerous for some readers to swallow. Edmund Wilson expressed his distaste for Wimsey in his criticism of The Nine Tailors: "There was also a dreadful stock English nobleman of the casual and debonair kind, with the embarrassing name of Lord Peter Wimsey, and, although he was the focal character in the novel ... I had to skip a good deal of him, too."

The character Harriet Vane, featured in four novels, has been criticised as a mere stand-in for the author. Many of the themes and settings of Sayers's novels, particularly those involving Vane, seem to reflect Sayers's own concerns and experiences. Vane, like Sayers, was educated at Oxford (unusual for a woman at the time) and is a mystery writer. Vane initially meets Wimsey when she is tried for poisoning her lover (Strong Poison); he immediately falls for her and insists on participating in the defence preparations for her retrial; but she rejects him. In Have His Carcase, she collaborates with Wimsey to solve a murder but still rejects his proposals of marriage. She eventually accepts (Gaudy Night) and marries him (Busman's Honeymoon).

Alleged anti-Semitism 
Biographers of Sayers have disagreed as to whether Sayers was anti-Semitic. In Sayers: A Biography, James Brabazon argues that she was. This conclusion is supported by Carolyn G. Heilbrun in Dorothy L. Sayers: Biography Between the Lines, who agrees with his assessment of anti-Semitism, but dissents from the excuses that he made for it.

Robert Kuhn McGregor and Ethan Lewis argue in Conundrums for the Long Week-End that Sayers was not anti-Semitic but used popular British stereotypes of class and ethnicity. In 1936, a translator wanted "to soften the thrusts against the Jews" in Whose Body?; Sayers, surprised, replied that the only characters "treated in a favourable light were the Jews!"

In the American Jewish publication Moment, opinion editor Amy E. Schwartz reviews Sayer's varying Jewish references and opines these offer an opportunity to determine which "questionable comments about Jews are seriously bad, which are bad but forgivable, which are dangerous and in need of denunciation and which are essentially trivial and best ignored." She sees Sayers as providing an incentive to re-examine the "present moment’s tendency to take instant and maximum offense at any questionable reference to anybody."

Personal life

John Cournos 
In 1920 Sayers entered into a passionate though unconsummated romance with Jewish Russian émigré and Imagist poet John Cournos, who moved in London literary circles with Ezra Pound and his contemporaries. Sayers did not consummate her relationship with him unmarried, due to her religious beliefs.

Cournos disdained monogamy and marriage, did not want children and was dedicated to free love. He also considered crime writing, which Sayers had started, to be low brow, though he assisted her with aspects of publication. Within two years their relationship had broken up when he insisted on consummation with birth control. Returning to New York, he soon married a crime writer who had two children. This left Sayers embittered that he had not held to his own principles, feeling that he had been testing her, pushing her to sacrifice her own beliefs in submission to his own. He later confessed that he would have happily married Sayers if she had submitted to his sexual demands. After a period of heated correspondence, they concluded with more amicable missives after she met her future husband.

Her experiences with Cournos formed the basis for her character of Harriet Vane. Cournos is fictionalised as Philip Boyes in the novel Strong Poison, though she did not add intimate details from their affair. Cournos reflected upon the relationship in his novel The Devil is an English Gentleman (1932) and included many private details from the affair, adding whole sections from Sayers's private letters.

Motherhood 
In 1923 she had a rebound relationship with former Denstone College pupil and part-time car salesman William "Bill" White whom she presented to her parents. She had met him when he moved into the flat above hers in 24 Great James Street in December 1922. Only when she discovered her pregnancy in June 1923, White admitted to already being married. What happened next could have been from one of Sayers's fictional works: White told his wife Beatrice about the pregnancy the following morning and asked her for help with the birth. Mrs White agreed to meet Sayers in London. Together they went to White's flat (he was then living off Theobalds Road) and found him with another woman. Sayers: "He's like a child in a power house, starting off machinery regardless of results. No woman on earth could hold him". In exchange for the promise never to see White again, Mrs White invited Sayers to a guest house in her home town of Southbourne, Dorset, during the last stages of pregnancy and arranged for her own brother, Dr Murray Wilson, to attend the birth at Tuckton Lodge, a nursing-home in Ilford Lane, Southbourne. On 3 January 1924, at the age of 30, Sayers secretly gave birth to an illegitimate son, John Anthony (later surnamed Fleming). John Anthony, "Tony", was given into care with her aunt and cousin, Amy and Ivy Amy Shrimpton, and passed off as her nephew to family and friends. Details of these circumstances were revealed in a letter from Mrs White to her daughter Valerie, Tony's half-sister, in 1958 after Sayers's death.

Tony was raised by the Shrimptons and was sent to a good boarding school. In 1935 he was legally adopted by Sayers and her then husband "Mac" Fleming. While still not revealing her identity as his mother, Sayers was constantly in contact with her son, provided him with good education and they maintained a close relationship. John Anthony suspected Sayers's maternity since his youth but had proof only when he obtained his birth certificate applying for a passport. It is not known if he ever spoke to Sayers about the fact. Much to Sayers's pride, Tony won a scholarship to Balliol College – the same Oxford college Sayers had chosen for Wimsey.

Marriage to "Mac" Fleming 
After publishing her first two detective novels, Sayers married Captain Oswald Atherton "Mac" Fleming, a Scottish journalist whose professional name was "Atherton Fleming". The wedding took place on 13 April 1926 at Holborn Register Office, London. Fleming was divorced with two daughters.

Sayers and Fleming lived in the small flat at 24 Great James Street in Bloomsbury that Sayers maintained for the rest of her life. Fleming worked as an author and journalist and Sayers as an advertising copywriter and author. Over time, Fleming's health worsened, largely due to his First World War service, and as a result he became unable to work.

Deaths of Fleming, Sayers and son 
Fleming died on 9 June 1950, at Sunnyside Cottage (now 24 Newland Street), Witham, Essex, after a decade of severe illnesses.

Sayers died suddenly of a coronary thrombosis on 17 December 1957 at the same place, aged 64. Fleming's ashes were scattered in the churchyard at Biggar in Lanarkshire, centre of the Fleming ancestral lands. Sayers's remains were cremated and her ashes buried beneath the tower of St Anne's Church, Soho, London, where she had been a churchwarden for many years. Upon her death it was publicly revealed that her nephew, John Anthony, was her son; he was the sole beneficiary under his mother's will.

Sayer's son, John Anthony died on 26 November 1984 at age 60, in St. Francis's Hospital, Miami Beach, Florida. He had been married twice, having two children from his first marriage. In 1991 his half-sister Valerie White, unaware that he had died, wrote him a letter explaining his parents' story.

Sayers is commemorated with a green plaque on The Avenues, Kingston upon Hull.

Friendships

The Mutual Admiration Society 
Sayers was part of The Mutual Admiration Society (MAS), a literary society of undergraduate women during her studies in Somerville College, Oxford, one of Oxford's first two women's colleges. The MAS was formed by Sayers in 1912 along with two other Somerville students, Amphilis Middlemore and Charis Ursula Barnett as a women's writing community to read and critique each other's works. Sayers named the group "Mutual Admiration Society", remarking, "if we didn't give ourselves that title, the rest of College would." Prescott comments that, "The name was meant to be humorous, meant to soften its closed status, making its existence tolerable, even attractive, among students ... the MAS, by its very name, threw the ball back to those who looked upon women students at Oxford with hidden disdain or trepidation, aiming, with subtlety, that name toward male dominated Oxford."

Together, the MAS made one unique volume of written work, titled The Blue Moon. This contained six pieces, three of which were poems written by Sayers. Sayer's short story "Who Calls the Tune?" was also included.

Such a community allowed its female members within the largely male oriented environment of Oxford to have a literary haven where they could provide each other with literary, social, professional, and personal support. Their influences on one another extended throughout their academic and personal lives and they continued to remain in contact for decades after their Oxford days through letters and visits to one another.

Including Sayers, there are a total of 9 documented members: Dorothy L. Sayers, Amphilis Middlemore, Charis Ursula Barnett, Muriel Jaeger, Margaret Amy Chubb, Marjorie Maud Barber, Muriel St. Clare Byrne, Dorothy Hanbury Rowe, and Catherine Hope Godfrey. Prescott observes that this small society of undergraduate students in Oxford would come to produce "vibrant women, prolific authors, theatrical figures, social activists, teachers, and scholars in their own right" and that, "the women of the MAS shaped their lives, individually and collectively, as a testament to strength of purpose, not only with respect to their gender, but as fully invested members of humanity."

Friendship with the Inklings 
Sayers was a friend of C. S. Lewis and several of the other Inklings. On some occasions Sayers joined Lewis at meetings of the Socratic Club. Lewis said he read The Man Born to Be King every Easter, but he said he was unable to appreciate detective stories. J. R. R. Tolkien read some of the Wimsey novels but scorned the later ones, such as Gaudy Night.

C. S. Lewis 
Sayer's friendship with C. S. Lewis first began with a fan letter she had written in admiration of his Christian apologetic novel, The Screwtape Letters. Lewis later recounted, "[Sayers] was the first person of importance who ever wrote me a fan letter." He expressed his reciprocal admiration in a responding letter, calling her The Man Born to be King a complete success, and continued to read the play cycle every Holy Week thereafter. Their ongoing correspondence discussed their writing and academic interests, providing one another with criticisms, suggestions, and encouragement. Carol and Philip Zaleski note, “Sayers had much in common with Lewis and Tolkien’s circle, including a love of orthodox Christianity, traditional verse, popular fiction, and debate.”

Though the two became friends under the circumstance of shared academic and theological interests, they had their disagreements regarding the movement towards the ordination of women in the Church of England. Lewis, in opposition to the movement, had written to Sayers in request that she would also speak up against it. However Sayers, unable to see any theological reason against such an ordination, declined, writing back in a letter, "I fear you would find me rather an uneasy ally."

Sayers comments on Lewis's views of women in another letter, stating, "I do admit that he is apt to write shocking nonsense about women and marriage. (That, however, is not because he is a bad theologian but because he is a rather frightened bachelor.)”

G. K. Chesterton 
Sayers was greatly influenced by G. K. Chesterton, fellow detective fiction novelist, essayist, critic, among other things, commenting that, "I think, in some ways, G.K.’s books have become more a part of my mental make-up than those of any writer you could name.” She was familiar with Chesterton through his writings during her adolescent years and had attended his lectures in Oxford during her studies in Somerville. The two only became acquainted with one another as friends in 1917 when Sayers, a published author, approached Chesterton as mutual professionals.

In the preface to Chesterton's play, The Surprise, Sayers writes,To the young people of my generation, G.K.C. was a kind of Christian liberator. Like a beneficent bomb, he blew out of the Church a quantity of stained glass of a very poor period, and let in the gusts of fresh air in which the dead leaves of doctrine danced with all the energy and indecorum of Our Lady’s Tumbler.

The Detection Club 

Sayers, along with Chesterton, was a founder member of the Detection Club, a group for British mystery writers. Chesterton was elected its first president (1930–1936) and Sayers its third (1949–1957).

Legacy 

Some of the dialogue spoken by character Harriet Vane reveals Sayers poking fun at the mystery genre, even while adhering to various conventions.

Sayers's work was frequently parodied by her contemporaries. E. C. Bentley, the author of the early modern detective novel Trent's Last Case, wrote a parody entitled "Greedy Night" (1938).

Sayers was a founder and early president of the Detection Club, an eclectic group of practitioners of the art of the detective novel in the so-called golden age, for whom she constructed an idiosyncratic induction ritual. The Club still exists and, according to P. D. James who was a long-standing member, continued to use the ritual. In Sayers's day it was the custom of the members to publish collaborative detective novels, usually writing one chapter each without prior consultation. These works have not held the market, and have only rarely been in print since their first publication.

Her characters, and Sayers herself, have appeared in some other works, including:
Jill Paton Walsh published four novels about Peter Wimsey and Harriet Vane: Thrones, Dominations (1998), a completion of Sayers's manuscript left unfinished at her death; A Presumption of Death (2002), including extracts from the "Wimsey Papers", letters ostensibly written by various Wimseys and published in The Spectator during the Second World War; The Attenbury Emeralds (2010), based on Lord Peter's "first case", briefly referred to in a number of Sayers's novels; and a sequel, The Late Scholar (2013), in which Peter and Harriet have finally become the Duke and Duchess of Denver. 
Dorothy Sayers is mentioned by Agatha Christie in chapter 8 of her novel The Body in the Library, along with John Dickson Carr, H. C. Bailey and herself.
Wimsey appears (together with Hercule Poirot and Father Brown) in C. Northcote Parkinson's comic novel Jeeves (after Jeeves, the gentleman's gentleman of the P. G. Wodehouse canon).
Wimsey makes a cameo appearance in Laurie R. King's A Letter of Mary, one of a series of books relating the further adventures of Sherlock Holmes.
Sayers appears with Agatha Christie as a title character in Dorothy and Agatha , a murder mystery by Gaylord Larsen, in which a man is murdered in Sayers's dining room and she has to solve the crime.

Sayers house at Christ Church Cathedral School is named after her. Sayers Classical Academy in Louisville, Kentucky, is named after her.

Minor planet 3627 Sayers is named after her. The asteroid was discovered by Luboš Kohoutek, but the name suggested by Brian G. Marsden with whom Sayers consulted extensively during the last year of her life in her attempt to rehabilitate the Roman poet Lucan.

In 2022, Sayers was officially added to the Episcopal Church liturgical calendar with a feast day on 17 December.

Works

Notes

References

Citations

Sources 

 Op. I by Dorothy Sayers (poetry): digital.library.upenn.edu 
 The Lost Tools of Learning by Dorothy L. Sayers: Audio of this essay  
 Brabazon, James, Dorothy L. Sayers: a Biography (1980; New York: Avon, 1982) 
 Dale, Alzina Stone, Maker and Craftsman: The Story of Dorothy L. Sayers (1993; backinprint.com, 2003) 
 
 McGregor, Robert Kuhn & Lewis, Ethan Conundrums for the Long Week-End : England, Dorothy L. Sayers, and Lord Peter Wimsey (Kent, OH, & London: Kent State University Press, 2000) 
 Prescott, Barbara, "Dorothy L. Sayers & the Mutual Admiration Society: Friendship and Creative Writing in an Oxford Women's Literary Group." INKLINGS FOREVER, Vol. 10. Proceedings of the 2016 Frances W. Eubank Colloquium on Lewis & Friends. (Winged Lion Press, 2017)
 Reynolds, Barbara, Dorothy L. Sayers: Her Life and Soul (London: Hodder & Stoughton, 1993; rev. eds 1998, 2002) 
 Sørsdal, Randi, From Mystery to Manners: A Study of Five Detective Novels by Dorothy L. Sayers, Masters thesis, University of Bergen, bora.uib.no

Further reading and scholarship 

 Armstrong, Joel. "The Strange Case of Harriet Vane: Dorothy L. Sayers Anticipating Poststructuralism in the 1930s." Clues: A Journal of Detection 33.1 (2015): 112–22.
 Brown, Janice, The Seven Deadly Sins in the Work of Dorothy L. Sayers (Kent, OH, & London: Kent State University Press, 1998) 
 Connelly, Kelly C. "From Detective Fiction to Detective Literature: Psychology in the Novels of Dorothy L. Sayers and Margaret Millar." Clues: A Journal of Detection 25.3 (2007): 35–47.
 Coomes, David, Dorothy L. Sayers: A Careless Rage for Life (1992; London: Chariot Victor Publishing, 1997) 
 Dean, Christopher, ed., Encounters with Lord Peter (Hurstpierpoint: Dorothy L. Sayers Society, 1991) 
 —, Studies in Sayers: Essays presented to Dr Barbara Reynolds on her 80th Birthday (Hurstpierpoint: Dorothy L. Sayers Society, 1991) 
Downing, Crystal, Writing Performances: The Stages of Dorothy Sayers (New York: Palgrave Macmillan, 2004) 
 Gorman, Anita G., and Leslie R. Mateer. "The Medium Is the Message: Busman's Honeymoon as Play, Novel, and Film." Clues: A Journal of Detection 23.4 (2005): 54–62.
 Joshi, S. T. (2019). "Dorothy L Sayers: Lords and Servants" in Varieties of Crime Fiction (Wildside Press) .
 Kenney, Catherine. The Remarkable Case of Dorothy L. Sayers (1990; Kent, OH, & London: Kent State University Press, 1992) 
 Lennard, John, 'Of Purgatory and Yorkshire: Dorothy L. Sayers and Reginald Hill's Divine Comedy', in Of Modern Dragons and other essays on Genre Fiction (Tirril: Humanities-Ebooks, 2007), pp. 33–55. 
 Loades, Ann. "Dorothy L. Sayers: War and Redemption." In Hein, David, and Edward Henderson, eds. C. S. Lewis and Friends: Faith and the Power of Imagination, pp. 53–70. London: SPCK, 2011.
 McGlynn, Mary. "Parma Violets and Pince-Nez: Dorothy L. Sayers’s Meritocracy." Clues: A Journal of Detection 37.2 (2019): 71–82.
 Mills, Rebecca. “‘I Always Did Hate Watering-Places’: Tourism and Carnival in Agatha Christie’s and Dorothy L. Sayers’s Seaside Novels.” Clues: A Journal of Detection 37.2 (2019): 83–93.
 Nelson, Victoria, L. is for Sayers: A Play in Five Acts (Dreaming Spires Publications, 2012) 
 Sandberg, Eric. Dorothy L. Sayers: A Companion to the Mystery Fiction (Jefferson, NC: McFarland & Co, 2021) 
 Webster, Peter, 'Archbishop Temple's offer of a Lambeth degree to Dorothy L. Sayers'. In: From the Reformation to the Permissive Society. Church of England Record Society (18). Boydell and Brewer, Woodbridge, 2010, pp. 565–582. . Full text in SAS-Space
 Young, Laurel. "Dorothy L. Sayers and the New Woman Detective Novel." Clues: A Journal of Detection 23.4 (2005): 39–53.

External links 

 Online editions
 
 
 
 
 
 

 General
 The Dorothy L. Sayers Society
 

 Archives
 Dorothy Sayers archives at the Marion E. Wade Center at Wheaton College
 Dorothy L. Sayers letters and poems at the Mortimer Rare Book Collection, Smith College Special Collections
 

 Articles
 Dorothy L Sayers in Gallowaythe scene of her novel Five Red Herrings (1931)
 "Dorothy L. Sayers: A Christian Humanist for Today" by Mary Brian Durkin
 "Second Glance: Dorothy Sayers and the Last Golden Age" by Joanna Scutts

1893 births
1957 deaths
People educated at Christ Church Cathedral School
First women admitted to degrees at Oxford
Alumni of Somerville College, Oxford
Anglican writers
Christian apologists
Christian humanists
Christian novelists
Churchwardens
British copywriters
English Anglicans
English crime fiction writers
English mystery writers
English women dramatists and playwrights
French–English translators
Italian–English translators
Lay theologians
Members of the Detection Club
Writers from Oxford
Sherlock Holmes scholars
English dramatists and playwrights
People educated at Godolphin School
Translators of Dante Alighieri
Women mystery writers
20th-century English novelists
20th-century English women writers
English women novelists
Women religious writers
20th-century translators
People from Bluntisham
People from Essex
Burials at St Anne's Church, Soho
Deaths from coronary thrombosis
Anglican saints